Luciano García Alén (25 May 1928 – 16 October 2015) was a Spanish physician and ethnographer, known for his studies of Galician culture. He was born in Pontevedra, Galicia, Spain to Alfredo García Hermida. His brother Alfredo García Alén was a historian.
García Alén died in Santiago de Compostela, Galicia, Spain, aged 87.

García Alén died in Santiago de Compostela, Galicia, Spain, aged 87.

References

1928 births
2015 deaths
Spanish scientists
20th-century Spanish physicians
21st-century Spanish physicians